Heroes for Sale is Nasty Idols fourth album release. Originally, the album was set for release in 1995 under the name The Fourth Reich. The album was released in 2002 under the revised name by Perris Records, as the band's original label (HSM) had gone bankrupt back in 1994.

Track listing

Personnel
 Andy Pierce - Vocals
 Peter Espinoza - Lead Guitar
 Dick Qwarfort - Bass
 Stanley - Drums

References

2002 albums
Nasty Idols albums